The North Okanagan Knights are a Junior "B" Ice Hockey team based in Armstrong, British Columbia, Canada. They are members of the Bill Ohlhausen Division of the Okanagan/Shuswap Conference of the Kootenay International Junior Hockey League (KIJHL). They play their home games at Nor-Val Centre.

History

The Knights joined the KIJHL in 2009, but finished dead-last in the Okanagan Division with a record of 11-35-0-4, missing the playoffs. In 2010-11, the Knights joined the new Doug Birks Division, but finished last again, losing 4-1 in the first round of the playoffs to Revelstoke. For 2011-12, the Knights improved to third place in the Doug Birks Division, with a record of 35-16-0-1, before losing to Kamloops in the first round of the playoffs. The following year the Knights won the Doug Birks Division for the first time, and reached the league championship series, losing in six games to Castlegar. For 2013-14, the Knights were moved to the Okanagan Division, following the relocation of the Okanagan Division's Penticton Lakers to 100 Mile House. They finished fourth in their new division, but defeated the division champions Summerland Steam in seven games in the first round, before losing to Osoyoos. In 2014-15, the Knights struggled immensely, finishing with a record of 6-41-1-4, and failed to make the playoffs. The following year, the Knights compiled a 14-30-3-0-5 record, finishing fourth in the Okanagan Division. They lost, 0-4, to Osoyoos in the first round.

Season-by-season record

Note: GP = Games played, W = Wins, L = Losses, T = Ties, OTL = Overtime Losses, Pts = Points, GF = Goals for, GA = Goals against

Records as of February 18, 2012.

Playoffs

Records as of March 3, 2023.

References

External links
Official website of the North Okanagan Knights

Ice hockey teams in British Columbia
2009 establishments in British Columbia
Ice hockey clubs established in 2009